Steve Reinke (born 1963) is a Canadian video artist and filmmaker.

Life
Reinke was born June 5, 1963, in Eganville, Ontario, Canada. He lives and works in Chicago, Illinois, where he is a professor of Art Theory and Practice at Northwestern University. He received his M.F.A. from Nova Scotia College of Art and Design in 1993.

Work
Reinke's best known work is The 100 Videos (1996) and consists of one hundred separate videos created between 1990 and 1996.

As a writer and editor, Reinke has co-edited Lux: A Decade of Artists' Film and Video, 2000 and published Everybody Loves Nothing: Video 1996-2004, 2004.

Exhibitions
Reinke exhibited in the 2014 Whitney Biennial. He has additionally exhibited at the Museum of Modern Art, Pompidou Centre, Tate, National Gallery of Canada, International Film Festival Rotterdam and the New York Video Festival.

Collections
Reinke's work is included in the permanent collections of the National Gallery of Canada and the Museum of Modern Art.

Awards
In 2006, Reinke won the Bell Canada Award for Video Art, administered by the Canada Council for the Arts.

References

Canadian video artists
Living people
1963 births
Artists from Ontario
People from Renfrew County